"Wasted Years" is a song by the English heavy metal band Iron Maiden. It is the band's fourteenth single released and the first from their sixth studio album, Somewhere in Time (1986). It is the only song on the album that features no synthesizers. Released in 1986, it was the first single solely written by guitarist Adrian Smith, who also sings backing vocals. It reached number 18 in the UK Singles Charts.

Synopsis
The song deals with subject of homesickness and alienation, as well as the negative aspects of the band's nearly year long previous tour and personal problems that Smith and other band members were going through in that period. At the same time the chorus suggests the idea that one should move beyond past troubles and look forward. The original working title was "Golden Years", as can be heard on numerous Somewhere on Tour bootlegs.

The cover depicts the band mascot Eddie's point of view as he flies a time machine. Only a part of Eddie's face is seen, as a reflection in a screen. According to artist Derek Riggs, this is because the band did not want to reveal the mascot in his new cyborg guise until the album was released a few weeks later. As with the Somewhere in Time album sleeve, the single cover also features the TARDIS from the BBC series Doctor Who. Riggs describes the illustration as "a duffer. It's a technical illustration of a keyboard of a time machine, with Eddie reflected in the window, because it was the only thing we could think of that wouldn't give Eddie away".

The promotional video features black-and-white footage of the band playing the song in a studio in Frankfurt, West Germany, mixed with various scenes from band's previous promotional videos, together with clips and pictures of their off-show activities during the World Slavery Tour as well as the pre-solo evolution of Eddie from several album and tour artworks.

"Wasted Years" is featured in the 2007 video game Rock Band.

B-sides
The B-side "Reach Out" was sung by Adrian Smith, with regular lead singer Bruce Dickinson providing backing vocals. This song was previously performed live by Nicko McBrain and Smith's side project The Entire Population of Hackney.

The demential song "Sheriff of Huddersfield" is about Iron Maiden manager Rod Smallwood's decision to move to Los Angeles and buy a house in the Hollywood Hills. Apparently he had trouble adjusting to the LA lifestyle and often complained to the band about it. Smallwood was unaware of the composition until it was released on the single, as the band had kept it secret from him. The song opens with the spoken line "We're on a mission from Rod", a parody of the tagline for The Blues Brothers, "We're on a mission from God". The main guitar riff and verse vocal melodies are borrowed from the song "Life in the City" by Smith's prior band Urchin. Later, a similar comedy piece called "Bayswater Ain't a Bad Place to Be", again mocking Smallwood, was released as an unlisted untitled b-side ("Space Station No. 5"'s epilogue) in the "Be Quick or Be Dead" single.

Composition
The song is composed in the key of E minor. Adrian Smith plays the guitar solo.

Live performances
"Wasted Years" is one of three tracks from Somewhere in Time that have been played on more than two concert tours, the other two being the album's second single, "Stranger in a Strange Land", and "Heaven Can Wait". It was featured on Somewhere On Tour, Seventh Tour of a Seventh Tour, Real Live Tour (only on few dates), The Ed Hunter Tour, Somewhere Back in Time World Tour and Maiden England World Tour. It was the final song of the group's encore set on The Book of Souls World Tour, the first time it has ever been part of an encore performance.

Adrian Smith has performed the song live with his bands Psycho Motel and Smith/Kotzen, performing the lead vocals himself.

Janick Gers played the solo on Real Live Tour due to Smith leaving Iron Maiden in 1990. He also played all Smith's guitar parts on few dates of Ed Hunter Tour, while Smith was absent. In current Iron Maiden line-up shows (since 1999), Smith's trademark intro riff is doubled by Gers.

During Somewhere On Tour years, the band used to lip sync the track on various TV shows. The most famous recording comes from Germany, where Iron Maiden swapped instruments on stage while the song was "performed", as a humorous protest to lip syncing.

Track listing
7" single

12" single

Personnel
Production credits are adapted from the 7-inch vinyl cover.

Iron Maiden 
Bruce Dickinson – vocals, backing vocals on "Reach Out"
Adrian Smith – guitar, backing vocals, lead vocals on "Reach Out"
Dave Murray – guitar
Steve Harris – bass
Nicko McBrain – drums

Production 
Martin Birch – producer, engineer, mixing
Derek Riggs – cover illustration
Aaron Rapoport – photography

Chart performance

Notes

References

1986 singles
Iron Maiden songs
Songs written by Adrian Smith
1986 songs
EMI Records singles
Song recordings produced by Martin Birch